Dhaka College ( also known as DC) is the oldest secular educational institution of Bangladesh located in  New Market, Dhaka 1205 . It offers higher secondary education (HSC). It has Honours and Masters programs as well which are affiliated to the University of Dhaka.

History 

Dhaka College is one of Bangladesh's most important as well as earliest higher-secondary educational institutions. It was established by James Taylor Wise (civil surgeon at Dhaka) in 1835 as an English Seminary School (present Dhaka Collegiate School). Wise organized a local Committee of Public Instruction with the help of district magistrate Grant.
The school building was built partly out of public donations on the grounds of an English factory. On 18 July 1841, the school got its approval from the college. On 20 November 1841, the foundation stone of the college was placed and buildings were completed in 1846, with the aid of the Bishop of Calcutta. In the first graduating class there were both Muslim and Hindu students, as well as a number of foreign students, mainly from Armenia and Portugal.

The college was relocated in 1873 to a large building to the east of Victoria Park in order to accommodate the physics and chemistry laboratories. In 1908, it shifted to Curzon Hall while the science departments were housed in the present chemistry building of the University of Dhaka and two new halls were built there as well. In 1921, the college shifted again to the old High Court Building as the University of Dhaka was established there. During the Second World War, it moved to Siddique Bazar in Purana Dhaka. Finally, the college found its own permanent campus on Mirpur Road, Dhanmondi near Dhaka New Market in 1955.

Affiliations
 Calcutta University  (18 July 1857 – 1 July 1921)
 University of Dhaka  (1 July 1921 – 20 October 1992)
 National University, Bangladesh  (21 October 1992 – 15 February 2017)
 University of Dhaka  (16 February 2017 – present) 

Partial list of the principals

 IK Selim Ullah Khandakar (2021–present)

Campus

Library 

The library of Dhaka College was established in 1841 at the time of establishment of the college. It has a collection around 50, 000 books.

Sports facilities  

There are three sports filed in this institution. One of the biggest fields is known as the main field of the college, the other one is located around the halls and the other is situated ahead of the main building which is named Dhaka College Badminton Court.

Residential student halls 
There are eight residential halls:
 South Hall
 North Hall
 International Hall
 West Hall (for Non-Muslim only)
 Akhtaruzzaman Elias Hall
 Shaheed Farhad Hossain Hall (also known as Masters Hall)
 Southern Hall
 Shaheed Sheikh Kamal Hall (for HSC students)

Transport 

Dhaka college has eight buses to transport students from different areas of Dhaka city. They are:
 Bus no. 1 Shankhanil (শঙ্খনীল) - starts from Mirpur 10.
 Bus no. 2 Pushpak (পুষ্পক) - starts from Signboard.
 Bus no. 3 Shankhachil (শঙ্খচিল) - starts from Shahjatpur, Notun bazar, Gulshan.
 Bus no. 4 Padmanil (পদ্মনীল) - starts from Khilgaon Railgate.
 Bus no. 5 Nilgiri (নীলগিরি) - starts from Bosila Bridge.
 Bus no. 6 Bijoy 71 (বিজয় ৭১) - starts from Uttara.
 Bus no. 7 - starts from Chittagong Road.
 Bus no. 8 - starts from College Campus.

Organizations 
Dhaka College has various types of social organizations to implement its student skill.

 Red Crescent Youth 
 Rover Scout
 BNCC
 Badhon 
 Dhaka College Cultural Club 
 Dhaka College Debating Club 
 Dhaka College English Club 
 Dhaka College Science Club 
 Dhaka College Business Club 
 Dhaka College Journalist Association

Academics 
Dhaka College offers HSC, four years Honours, and one year Masters course in various majors.

HSC level 
 Science
 Business Studies
 Humanities

Honours and Masters level 

Faculty of Science
 Botany
 Chemistry
 Geography and Environment
 Mathematics
 Psychology
 Physics
 Statistics
 Zoology

Faculty of Arts
 English
 Bengali
 History
 Philosophy
 Islamic History and Culture
 Arabic and Islamic Studies
 Political Science

Faculty of Social Science
 Economics
 Political Science
 Sociology

Faculty of Business Studies
 Management
 Accounting

Notable alumni 

 M. Zahid Hasan, scientist and endowed chair Eugene Higgins Professor of Physics at Princeton University
 Zillur Rahman, the 19th President of Bangladesh
 Major General Khaled Mosharraf, Bir Uttom, 4th Chief of Army Staff, Bangladesh Army
 Colonel Shafaat Jamil, Bir Bikrom
 Tajuddin Ahmad, first Prime Minister of Bangladesh.
 A Q M Badruddoza Chowdhury, 13th President of Bangladesh
 Jamilur Reza Choudhury, Adviser (Minister) to Caretaker Government of Bangladesh & Former Vice-Chancellor of BRAC University
 Ismail Faruque Chowdhury, former Engineer-in-Chief of the Bangladesh Army
 Musharrof Husain Khan, 5th vice-chancellor of Bangladesh University of Engineering and Technology
 Sheikh Kamal, freedom fighter, founder of Abahani Limited (Dhaka)
 Sheikh Jamal, freedom fighter, second son of Sheikh Mujibur Rahman
 Monirul Islam (police officer), additional commissioner of Bangladesh Police and the current Chief of Counter Terrorism and Transnational Crime (CTTC).
 Imran Khan (businessman), Entrepreneur & Former CSO - Chief Strategy Officer of Snap Inc.
 Golam Maula Rony is a Bangladeshi politician,  businessman & writer 
 Mujibur Rahman Chowdhury popularly known as Nixon Chowdhury, is a Bangladeshi politician
 Shafi Imam Rumi, freedom fighter and martyr, son of Jahanara Imam
 Abdur Razzak, educator, intellectual and one of the National Professors of Bangladesh
 Mufazzal Haider Chaudhury, prominent Bengali essayist, educator and linguist of the Bengali language and Martyred Intellectual
 A R Mallick, historian, founding vice-chancellor of Chittagong University, and former Minister of Finance
 Fazle Hasan Abed, founder and chairman of BRAC, recipient of Ramon Magsaysay Award
 Muhammad Shahjahan, 6th vice-chancellor of Bangladesh University of Engineering and Technology
 Nooruddin Ahmed, 8th vice-chancellor of Bangladesh University of Engineering and Technology
 Humayun Ahmed, novelist, filmmaker, songwriter, and chemist
 Muhammed Zafar Iqbal, academic and writer, recipient of Bangla Academy Literary Award
 Jamilur Reza Choudhury, vice-chancellor of University of Asia Pacific, recipient of the Ekushey Padak
 Rashed Khan Menon, politician
 Abdur Razzaq, former minister of water resources
 Shafique Ahmed, former law minister
 Muhiuddin Khan Alamgir, former home minister
 Faruk Khan, former civil aviation and tourism minister
 Kazi Zafarullah, industrialist and politician
 Tawfiq-e-Elahi Chowdhury, Bir Bikram and the Energy Adviser to the Prime Minister of Bangladesh
 Abul Hassan Mahmud Ali, diplomat and politician, current Bangladesh foreign minister
 Zunaid Ahmed Palak, lawyer and politician, current Telecommunications & Information Technology Minister
 Tanzir Tuhin, architect, musician, member of the band Avash
 Shafiq Tuhin, lyricist and music director
 Manna, actor
 Khaled Khan, actor
 Shajal Noor, actor
 Afran Nisho, actor
 Ferdous Ahmed, actor
 Haider A. Khan: Freedom Fighter, professor, international economist, poet, translator, literary, music, art and film critic
 Mosharraf Karim, Actor 
 Mohiuddin Ahmad, historian
 Dinesh Chandra Sen, writer and researcher of Bengali folklore
 Lutfor Rahman Riton, recipient of Bangla Academy Literary Award
 Nowsher Ali Khan Yusufzai, writer and philanthropist
 Shamsur Rahman, poet
 Mahadev Saha, poet
 Kaiser Haq, poet and writer
 Abu Zafar Obaidullah, poet
 Rudra Mohammad Shahidullah, poet
 Abul Hasan, poet and journalist
 Shahidul Zahir, poet
 Mir Masoom Ali, George and Frances Ball Distinguished Professor Emeritus, statistician and educator
 Ghulam Murshid, author, scholar and journalist
 Qazi Motahar Hossain, author, statistician and one of the National Professors of Bangladesh
 Khan Bahadur Abdul Aziz, educationist, writer and social worker
 Syed Modasser Ali, ophthalmologist
 Zafrullah Chowdhury, public health activist, recipient of Ramon Magsaysay Award and Independence Day Award
 Mohammed Fazle Rabbee, cardiologist, medical researcher and Martyred Intellectual
 Meghnad Saha, FRS, astrophysicist and developer of Saha equation
 Akbar Ali Khan, economist
 Abdul Karim, soil scientist
 Mustafa Jabbar, the entrepreneur behind the Bijoy Bangla computing interface
 M Harunur Rashid, archaeologist, educationist and museum curator
 Mohammad Samir Hossain, a theorist in death anxiety
 Debapriya Bhattacharya, economist and public policy analyst
 Sir Krishna Govinda Gupta, ICS, member, Secretary of State's Council, UK (1907)
 Niaz Murshed, chess Grandmaster
 Nicholas Pogose, Armenian merchant and zamindar
 Anwarul Iqbal, BPM (Bar), PPM, adviser (2007–2009) to the interim Caretaker Government of Bangladesh, founder Director General of the Rapid Action Battalion (RAB)
 Waheedul Haq, journalist, writer, musicologist, and one of the founders of Chhayanaut
 Abul Mansur Ahmed, journalist, recipient of Bangla Academy Literary Award and Independence Day Award
 Ahmed Humayun, journalist, recipient of the Ekushey Padak
 Serajur Rahman, journalist, broadcaster, columnist
 Abul Kalam Shamsuddin, journalist and author
 Shafik Rehman, journalist
 A. F. M. Abdur Rahman, justice of Bangladesh Supreme court
 Syed Ishtiaq Ahmed, former Attorney General
 A. F. Mujibur Rahman, jurist and first Bengali Muslim Indian Civil Service (ICS) officer
 Maqsudul Alam, life-science scientist. first to decode the genome sequence of jute in Bangladesh and receiver of the  Independence Day Award.
 Dinesh Gupta, Indian revolutionary who took part in the Writers' Building attack
 Saima Akter, Indian revolutionary who took part in the Writers' Building attack

Notable faculty 
 Ayub Ali, educationist
 Akhtaruzzaman Elias, novelist and short story writer
 Akhtar Imam, educationist
 Iqbal Azeem, poet
 Nurul Haque Miah, professor of chemistry
 Walter Allen Jenkins, 7th vice-chancellor of the University of Dhaka
 George Harry Langley, 2nd vice-chancellor of the University of Dhaka
 Muhammad Mansuruddin, author, literary critic, essayist, lexicographer
 Mohammad Noman, educationist
 Mirza Fakhrul Islam Alamgir, Teacher, Politician.
 Shaukat Osman, novelist and short story writer
 Alauddin Al-Azad, poet, novelist, educationist
 Mohammad Rafiq, poet
 Prasanna Kumar Roy, first Indian principal of Presidency College, Kolkata
 Abdullah Abu Sayeed, educationist
 Kazi Abdul Wadud, essayist, critic, dramatist

References

External links
Official Website
 Dhaka College Alumni Category

 
Old Dhaka
Academic institutions associated with the Bengal Renaissance
Colleges in Bangladesh
Universities and colleges in Dhaka
1841 establishments in British India
Educational institutions established in 1841
University of Dhaka affiliates